Wheatland is an unincorporated community in Quay County, New Mexico, United States.

History
Wheatland traces its beginnings to the building of its first school. Several one-room schools existed in the area, including North Bend School, Blair School, and Adobe School. In 1920, these were consolidated to form Wheatland School, which was housed in a frame stucco building constructed for the purpose.

The original Wheatland School burned in April 1938. It was replaced by a new school building and gymnasium built by the WPA. The new buildings, reinforced with steel and plastered inside, used multicolored rock from a nearby quarry. A duplex teacherage was also built at the same time. Completed in 1939, the buildings were only used as a school until the early 1950s, after which they were used as a community center for a time before being abandoned.

See also

References

External links

Unincorporated communities in Quay County, New Mexico
Unincorporated communities in New Mexico